The 2022–23 Women's FA Cup is the 53rd staging of the Women's FA Cup, a knockout cup competition for women's football teams in England. Chelsea are the defending champions, having beaten Manchester City 3–2 in the 2022 Final on 15 May 2022.

In March 2022, it was announced the Women's FA Cup prize fund would be increasing ahead of the  2022–23 season from around £400,000 to a combined £3,000,000.

Teams 
A total of 438 teams were accepted into the 2022–23 Women's FA Cup, an increase of 21 from the previous year. Exemptions remained the same from the previous season: tier 5 teams are given an exemption for the first qualifying round, entering at the second round qualifying stage. The 48 teams that play in the FA Women's National League Division One (tier 4) are given exemption until third round qualifying, while teams in the Northern and Southern Premier Divisions (tier 3) will enter at the first round proper. The 12 Women's Championship teams (tier 2) are exempt until the third round proper, while the final teams to enter the competition will be the 12 Women's Super League teams (tier 1) which remain exempt until the fourth round proper.

First round qualifying
The competition started at the first round qualifying stage with 72 of the scheduled 87 games played in September 2022, made up of teams from outside the top five tiers of the women's football pyramid.

Second round qualifying
122 of the 128 scheduled matches were played in the second round qualifying in October 2022, including the introduction of teams from the fifth-tier regional first division football leagues.

Third round qualifying
84 of the 88 scheduled matches were played in the third round qualifying in October 2022, including the introduction of 48 teams from the fourth-tier FA Women's National League Division One.

First round proper
56 matches were played in the first round proper on 13 November 2022, made up of the 88 winning teams from the third round qualifying and including the introduction of 24 from teams the third-tier FA Women's National League Premier Division.

Second round proper
28 matches were played in the second round proper on 27 November 2022, made up of the 56 winning teams from the first round proper and not including the introduction of any new teams. The draw was made on 14 November 2022.

Third round proper
20 matches were scheduled to be played in the third round proper on 11 December 2022, made up of the 28 winning teams from the second round proper and including the introduction of 12 teams from the second-tier Women's Championship. The draw was completed on 28 November 2022.

Fourth round proper
16 matches were played in the fourth round proper on 29 January 2023, made up of the 20 winning teams from the third round proper and including the introduction of 12 teams from the first-tier Women's Super League. The fourth round proper was the final round to introduce new teams. The fourth round draw took place on 12 December 2022.

Fifth round proper
Eight matches were played in the fifth round proper on 26 February 2023, made up of the 16 winning teams from the fourth round proper. The fifth round draw took place on 30 January 2023.

Quarter-finals
Four matches were played in the quarter-finals on 19 March 2023, made up of the eight winning teams from the fifth round proper. The draw was made on 27 February 2023.

Semi-finals
Two matches will be played in the semi-finals on 16 April 2023, made up of the four winning teams from the quarter-finals.

Final

The final will be played at Wembley Stadium on Sunday 14 May 2023.

Television rights

References

Women's FA Cup seasons
Cup
Women's FA Cup